Nuuk Center, also shortened NC, is a shopping mall located in Nuuk, Greenland. The mall, which is the first shopping mall in Greenland, was inaugurated on July 27, 2012. Located next door to the Katuaq Culture Centre, the mall is focused on offering services to a broad spectrum of customers. Above the mall is an 8-story office tower with 7,000 square metres of space.

Nuuk Center is the largest and tallest building in Greenland.

Mall contents
The mall building houses several local stores as well as their ancillary subsidiaries and sublets, such as cafes and shops. It also contains Greenland's first underground car park.

Level One
 Pisiffik - supermarket
 Synoptik - eyewear
 Nønne - clothing
 Ittu.net - clothing
 BabySam - children and infant clothing
 Lege-Kaeden - toys
 IQ Naasut - decor
 Bog & Ide - bookstore
 Pascucci Corner - café
 Matas - general merchandise
 Torrak Fashion - clothing
 Bones - restaurant

Level Two
 Torrak Fashion - clothing
 Kop & Kande / Nice - housewear and other goods
 ONLY - trendy clothing and decor
 MDC Data - computer and consumer electronics
 Ninni's Ropero - women's fashion
 N<xt Generation - children's wear
 Salon Mariia - hair salon
 Pisattat - consumer goods
 Suustu - clothing
 Anori Art - clothing and specialty merchandise
 Asiarpa - décor
 Eskiman - clothing
 Pappi - women's fashion
 Elgiganten - consumer electronics

Reception and criticism
Nuuk Center was welcomed by the local businesses, headed by Nuuk Centre Association, and generally seen as a vehicle for strengthening the presence of local enterprises. By having a centrally placed mall, local businesses could thereby better compete with multinationals. The mall was also seen as an employment opportunity.

The mall did not receive an uncritical welcome, however. While some expressed concerns the mall would change both the dynamics and the esthetics of the city, others saw the mall as a threat to traditional trading customs. Members of the older generation perceived Nuuk as becoming "too European" by the integration and inclusion of what had been seen perceived as essentially "foreign" institutions.

Construction
The planning and construction of the mall started in 2005, headed by the Nuuk Centre Association. The works were carried out by MT Højgaard.

The mall offers its customers the services of the first indoor, underground parking hall built in the country's capital.

References 

Buildings and structures in Nuuk
Shopping malls established in 2012
Shopping malls in Greenland